Fifth Fleet or 5th fleet may mean:

 United States Fifth Fleet
 IJN 5th Fleet, Imperial Japanese Navy
 Luftflotte 5

See also
 
 
 
 
 Fifth (disambiguation)
 Fleet (disambiguation)
 Fourth Fleet (disambiguation)
 Sixth Fleet (disambiguation)